Chhatrapur (also spelt as Chatarpur) is a town and a Notified Area Council since 1955 in Ganjam district in the state of Odisha, India. It is the district headquarters town of Ganjam district. Chhatrapur is a Tehsil / Block (CD) in the Ganjam District of Odisha. According to Census 2011 information the sub-district code of Chhatrapur block is 03085. Total area of Chhatrapur is  including  rural area and  urban area. Chhatrapur has a population of 94,683 people. There are 20,415 houses in the sub-district. There are about 46 villages in Chhatrapur block.

Demographics
 India census, Chhatrapur had a population of 22,027 (Second biggest city in the district of Ganjam after Berhampur. Males constitute 51% of the population and females 49%. Chhatrapur has an average literacy rate of 89%, higher than the national average of 59.5%; with male literacy of 85% and female literacy of 73%. 10% of the population is under 6 years of age.

Transport
Chhatrapur is the administrative capital of Ganjam and gateway to south Odisha, and has a well-developed transportation network. All express trains of Indian railway have a halt here. It is well connected with the Howrah madras highway so all luxury busses also passing through.

Road
Chhatrapur city is connected with National Highways NH-16 (Chennai – Kolkata), NH-59 (Khariar – Berhampur) and State Highway 36 (Odisha) (Surada to Chhatrapur via Hinjilicut) with other cities and towns of Odisha. The three-wheeler auto taxis are the most important mode of transportation in this city. Taxis also ply on the city's roads. The Ganjam Urban Transport Services Limited (GUTSL) with joint partnership with Odisha State Road Transport Corporation (OSRTC) have come up with an agreement, valid for one year, to run a city-bus service for Berhampur to Chhatrapur and urban centres on its periphery (Gopalpur, and Hinjli) on 27 February 2014.

Rail
Chatrapur railway station is situated on the East coast railway line which is a major route connecting the two metros Kolkata and Chennai of India. It is directly connected to New Delhi, Ahmadabad, Bangalore, Bhubaneswar, Berhampur, Chennai, Cuttack, Mumbai, Nagpur, Pune, Puri, Vishakhapatnam, Hyderabad, Kolkata, Raipur, Sambalpur and many more cities of India. Bhubaneswar – Chhatrapur connectivity (DMU) is popular connectivity to reach capital city Bhubaneswar.

There are two railway stations in Chhatrapur; they are Chhatrapur Station CAP and Chhatrapur Court Station which is a Passenger Halt.

History
The Ganjam area was a part of the ancient Kalinga empire which was occupied by King Ashoka in 261 B.C During this period it was the main route of South and East for shipping. Its huge number of black elephants attracted king Ashok to invading Kalinga.

The district was named after the old township and European fort of Ganjam situated on the northern bank of river Rushikulya, which was the headquarter of the district. In 1757 it was French Commander Bussy, who marched into Ganjam and realized areas of tribute from feudal chiefs. It was the English who ultimately defeated the French in the Deccan and annexed Ganjam in 1759.

The modern Ganjam carved out of the Vizag district of Madras Presidency and came into existence on 31.03.1936. Ganjam district separated from Madras Presidency and formed a part of the newly created state of Odisha with effect from 1.4.1936. The re-organized district comprises the whole of Ghumusar, Chhatrapur and Baliguda divisions, part of old Berhampur taluk, part of old Ichhapur taluk, part of Parlakhemundi plains and the whole of Parlakhemundi agency area in the old Chicacola division.

In the year 1992, after the reorganization of districts by the Government of Odisha, the 7 blocks of the Parlakhemundi subdivision were separated and the new district of Gajapati formed and 3 subdivisions, 22 blocks, and 18 urban areas remain in the Ganjam district.

Climate and regional setting
The maximum summer temperature is 37 °C; the minimum winter temperature is 16 °C. The mean daily temperature varies from 33 °C to 38 °C. May is the hottest month; December is the coldest. The average annual rainfall is 1250  mm and the region receives monsoon and torrential rainfall from July to October.

Politics
In 2019 Member of the Legislative Assembly (India) (MLA) from Chhatrapur Assembly Constituency is Subash Chandra Behera of Biju Janata Dal (BJD, who won the seat in State elections of 2019. Previous MLAs from this seat include Dr Priyanshu Pradhan of BJD who won this seat in 2014, Narayan Reddy of CPI who won this seat in 2004 Rama Chandra Panda of Bharatiya Janata Party (BJP)who won this seat in 2000, Daitari Behera of Indian National Congress (INC) in 1995, Parsuram Panda of CPI in 1990, Ashok Kumar Choudhury of INC in 1985, and Biswanath Sahu of CPI in 1980 and in 1977.

in 2014 
In this year five political party filled Nomination in election of MLA in Chhatrapur (Odisha Vidhan Sabha constitution).
BJD - PRIYANSU PRADHAN. (Won MLA in Chhatrapur)
BJP - DHARANI DHARA BEHERA
CONG- BONAMALI SETHY
CPI- KRUSNA CHANDRA NAYAK
AAP- mis SETHY

MP filled nomination for Chhatrapur

CONG- CHANDRASAKHER SAHU
BJD- SIDHANT MAHAPATRA (Won MP seat in Chhatrapur)
BJP- RAMA PANDA
CPI M- ALI PATNAYAK
APP- JANASWER MISHRA
SWADHINA- SYAMBABU SUBUDHI

Chhatrapur is part of Berhampur (Lok Sabha constituency).

References

Cities and towns in Ganjam district